717 Harwood is a skyscraper in Downtown Dallas, Texas. The building rises . It contains 34 floors, and was completed in 1980. 717 Harwood currently stands as the 22nd-tallest building in the city. The building is well known for its sloping exterior glass walls, which slant inward from the building's top floor to ground level. 717 Harwood is owned by SKW Funding, a New York-based real estate investment firm.

The building formerly housed the Dallas offices of KPMG, until their move in 2015 to the new KPMG Plaza tower.

717 Harwood is home to the headquarters of HilltopSecurities which is a subsidiary of Hilltop Holdings Inc. Other tenants include Active Network, Lanyon and Omnitracs, and HOK.

See also
 List of tallest buildings and structures in Dallas

References

External links
 717 Harwood on Emporis
 717 Harwood on SkyscraperPage

Skyscraper office buildings in Dallas
Downtown Dallas
Office buildings completed in 1980
KPMG